Aloys Wobben (22 January 1952 – 31 July 2021) was a German billionaire businessman, engineer, and the founder and owner of the wind turbine company Enercon. He was one of the 50 richest people in Germany, with a fortune estimated at €4.78 billion, as of November 2020. As of August 2021, Forbes estimated his net worth to be US$7.1 billion.

Early life 
Aloys Wobben was born in West Germany. He studied electrical engineering and earned a bachelor's degree from the University of Oldenburg.

Career 
In 1984 he founded the wind turbine manufacturer Enercon in Aurich. He began developing and producing wind turbines with three employees. In the following years, Enercon developed into one of the most successful companies in the German wind energy industry. In 1993, Wobben switched production to the gearless wind turbine with full converter that he had developed. The Enercon E-40 turbine met expectations and ensured the company's worldwide success.

For health reasons, Wobben withdrew from the operational business in 2012 and transferred his company shares to the Aloys-Wobben Foundation with effect from 1 October 2012. The foundation thus became the sole shareholder of the Enercon Group.

According to Forbes, Wobben had a net worth of $7.1 billion as of August 2021.

Personal life 
Wobben was married, with one child and lived in Aurich.

He died in August 2021, after a long illness.

Recognition 
 Order of Merit of the Federal Republic of Germany
 2000 German Environmental Prize of the German Federal Environmental Foundation
 2004 European Solar Prize from Eurosolar in the category "Special Prize for Special Personal Commitment"
 2006 Honorary doctorate from the University of Kassel
 2006 Indigenat, a kind of "honorary citizenship", from the Ostfriesische Landschaft for services to the East Frisian economy
 2008 Rudolf Diesel Medal in Gold from the German Institute for Invention (DIE)
 2009 Lower Saxony State Prize

References 

1952 births
2021 deaths
German company founders
20th-century German businesspeople
21st-century German businesspeople
German billionaires
People from Aurich
Recipients of the Order of Merit of the Federal Republic of Germany
University of Oldenburg alumni